Osgoldcross may refer to:

Osgoldcross (UK Parliament constituency)
Osgoldcross Wapentake
Osgoldcross Rural District